Tvarožná is a municipality and village in Brno-Country District in the South Moravian Region of the Czech Republic. It has about 1,300 inhabitants.

Geography
It lies on the border between the Drahany Highlands and the Dyje–Svratka Valley. The Tvaroženský brook flows through the municipality. There is also one pond in the municipal territory.

History
The first written mention of Tvarožná is from 1288.

The municipality is famous for the Battle of Austerlitz in 1805. Santon hill in the municipality was a strategic location for Napoleon's army, being occupied by the French general Claparèd and his 17th regiment.

Sights
The Church of Saint Nicholas is the landmark of the village. It was built in the neo-Gothic style in 1880–1881 and replaced an old structure from the early 14th century.

On the top of the hill is the Chapel of Saint Mary Major from 1832.

In Tvarožná is a replica of the French canon Gribeauval to commemorate the Battle of Austerlitz. It was originally placed on the Santon hill and later moved to the centre of the village.

Gallery

References

External links

 
Project Austerlitz – information about the battle

Villages in Brno-Country District